The 2017 Inter-Provincial Championship was the fifth edition of the Inter-Provincial Championship, a first-class cricket competition played in Ireland. It was held from 30 May to 7 September 2017. It was the first edition of the competition to be played with first-class status, following the outcome of a meeting by the International Cricket Council (ICC) in October 2016. Leinster Lightning won the tournament, their fifth-consecutive, and completed a domestic clean-sweep in the process.

Points table

 Champions

Fixtures

1st match

2nd match

3rd match

4th match

5th match

6th match

References

External links
 Series home at ESPN Cricinfo

Inter
Inter-Provincial Championship seasons